Charles Henry Poole (1874–1941) was a Liberal Party Member of Parliament in New Zealand.

Early life
Charles Poole was born in Ireland in 1874 before moving to Australia aged 11. He was a seaman by trade and also spent time living in Canada before settling in New Zealand. Upon arriving, he became an ardent leader of the local prohibition movement.

Political career

Poole won the Auckland West electorate in the 1905 general election, but was defeated in 1911 by James Bradney of the Reform Party. He won the electorate back in 1914, and retired in 1919. Poole was a dedicated Seddonite and possessed a rather aggressive oratory style, like Seddon himself.

Death
Poole died in 1941 in California where he was cremated. His ashes were shipped to Auckland and interred there.

Notes

References

1874 births
1941 deaths
New Zealand Liberal Party MPs
Unsuccessful candidates in the 1911 New Zealand general election